Losers' Club is a 2011 Turkish comedy-drama film, co-written and directed by Tolga Örnek based on a true story, starring Nejat İşler and Yiğit Özşener as the co-hosts of a controversial mid-90s Istanbul radio show.

Production
The film was shot on location in Kadıköy, Istanbul, Turkey.

Synopsis
Kaan and Mete, co-hosts of a mid 1990s radio show called Kaybedenler Kulübü (Losers' Club), struggle to deal with their daily lives after their show becomes an instant hit. Kaan meets Zeynep, the girl of his dreams, but their relationship comes under pressure as the show continues to stir controversy and attract fans from every segment of Istanbul society.

Cast
 Nejat Isler – Kaan
 Yiğit Özşener – Mete
 Ahu Türkpençe – Zeynep
 İdil Fırat – Asli
 Rıza Kocaoğlu – Murat
 Serra Yılmaz – Mother
 Barış Bağcı  – Devrim

Release and reception

Festival screenings 
 18th International Adana Golden Boll Film Festival (September 17–25, 2011)
 Turkish Movie Days, Helsinki (September 29 – October 1, 2011)

Awards 
18th International Adana Golden Boll Film Festival (September 17–25, 2011)
 Best Sound Effects: Burak Topalakçı (won, also for September)

See also
 Turkish films of 2011
 2011 in film

References

External links
 

2011 comedy-drama films
2011 films
Films set in Turkey
Films set in Istanbul
Turkish comedy-drama films